Tây Sơn is a district (huyện) of Bình Định province in the South Central Coast region of Vietnam. It is known for being the birthplace of the Tây Sơn dynasty.

The district capital lies at Phú Phong.

Geography 
Tây Sơn borders Gia Lai province to the west, the districts of An Nhơn and Phù Cát to the east, Vĩnh Thạnh to the north and Vân Canh to the south.

Transport and economy 
Most of the communes of Tây Sơn District lie on provincial road 19 between An Nhơn and Gia Lai province.

References

Districts of Bình Định province